Lycée Victor Hugo may refer to:

Schools in France:
Lycée Victor Hugo, Paris
Lycée Victor-Hugo de Besançon - Besançon
Lycée Victor-Hugo de Caen (FR) - Caen
Lycée Victor-Hugo de Château-Gontier (FR) - Château-Gontier
Lycée International Victor-Hugo in Colomiers
Lycée Victor-Hugo (Marseilles) in Marseilles
Lycée Victor-Hugo de Poitiers (FR) - Poitiers

Schools outside France:
Lycée Français Victor Hugo in Frankfurt, Germany
Lycée Victor Hugo in Florence, Italy
Lycée Franco-Nicaraguayen Victor Hugo in Managua, Nicaragua
Lycée Victor-Hugo de Marrakech (FR) in Marrakech, Morocco
Lycée français Victor-Hugo de Port-Gentil - Port-Gentil, Gabon